Tunetella is a genus of parasites of the phylum Apicomplexa.

There is one species in this genus — Tunetella emydis.

History

The species and genus was described by Brumpt and Lavier in 1935.

Description

This species infects the erythrocytes of tortoise Emys leprosa.

References

Apicomplexa genera
Parasites of reptiles